Phil Lowe (born 19 January 1950) is an English World Cup winning former professional rugby league footballer who played in the 1960s, 1970s and 1980s, and coached in the 1980s.

Teammate Mike Stephenson recalled, "Phil had a magnificent physique. He had a high leg movement and the ability to stride out of a tackle. A giant of a man and a brilliant exponent of a forward running out wide in the centre areas".

Background
Lowe was born in Hull, East Riding of Yorkshire, England,

Playing career
Lowe played left-, i.e. number 11, in Hull Kingston Rovers' 8–7 victory over Hull F.C. in the 1967–68 Yorkshire County Cup Final during the 1967–68 season at Headingley Rugby Stadium, Leeds on Saturday 14 October 1967. He was Hull Kingston Rovers's 'Player of the Season' in both 1968/69.

Lowe was a member of the last British Ashes winning squad in 1970, making his international debut on the NZ leg of the tour, scoring twice on his debut in a 33-16 in Auckland. The Ashes, similar to the cricket series of the same name, is a best-of-three series of test matches between the English (previously British) and Australian national rugby league football teams. Whilst playing for Hull Kingston Rovers, Lowe helped Great Britain to victory in the 1972 World Cup Final. He was Hull Kingston Rovers's 'Player of the Season' in both and 1972/73.
His 26 tries in the 1972/73 season, was a club record scoring feat by a Hull Kingston Rovers forward, beating William Sandham's 25-tries scored in the 1912–13 season. 

In 1974, Lowe was lured to Australia by Manly-Warringah secretary Ken Arthurson to play for the two-time defending Sydney premiers. There he joined fellow Great Britain international Mal Reilly, and hard hitting local junior Terry Randall in what was one of the strongest back rows in the Sydney premiership. He played three seasons in the New South Wales Rugby League premiership, including, their victory in the 1976 NSWRFL season's Grand Final over Parramatta, scoring his team's only try of the match. Among his teammates that day included Australian internationals Graham Eadie, Russel Gartner, Bob Fulton, and Terry Randall as well as fellow Englishmen Gary Stephens and Steve "Knocker" Norton. In three seasons with the Sea Eagles, Lowe played 72 games and scored 25 tries.

Lowe played left-, i.e. number 11, in Hull Kingston Rovers' 26–11 victory over St. Helens in the 1977 BBC2 Floodlit Trophy Final during the 1977–78 season at Craven Park, Hull on Tuesday 13 December 1977.
He played right-, i.e. number 12, in the 3–13 defeat by Hull F.C. in the 1979 BBC2 Floodlit Trophy Final during the 1979–80 season at the Boulevard, Hull on Tuesday 18 December 1979.
Lowe was a member of the Hull Kingston Rovers squad that won the Rugby League Championship in 1978-79 season.

Lowe played right-, i.e. number 12, in Hull Kingston Rovers' 10–5 victory over Hull F.C. in the 1979–80 Challenge Cup Final during the 1979–80 season at Wembley Stadium, London on Saturday 3 May 1980, in front of a crowd of 95,000. Lowe played left-, i.e. number 11 in the 7–8 defeat by Leeds in the 1980–81 Yorkshire County Cup Final during the 1980–81 season at Fartown, Huddersfield on Saturday 8 November 1980. Lowe played left-, i.e. number 11, in the 9–18 defeat by Widnes in the 1980–81 Challenge Cup Final during the 1980–81 season at Wembley Stadium, London on Saturday 2 May 1981, in front of a crowd of 92,496. Lowe played left-, i.e. number 11, in Hull Kingston Rovers' 11-7 victory over Hull F.C. in the 1980-81 Premiership Final during the 1980–81 season at Headingley Rugby Stadium, Leeds on Saturday 16 May 1981, in front of a crowd of 29,448.  His testimonial match at Hull Kingston Rovers took place in 1981. Lowe played left-, i.e. number 11, in Hull Kingston Rovers' 4–12 defeat by Hull F.C. in the 1981–82 John Player Trophy Final during the 1981–82 season at Headingley Rugby Stadium, Leeds on Saturday 23 January 1982.

Achievements

Ashes winner 1970

World Cup winner 1972

NSWRL Premiership winner 1976

Championship winner 1979

Challenge Cup winner 1980

Rugby League Premiership winner 1981

BBC2 Floodlit Trophy winner 1977

Yorkshire Cup winner 1967

Great Britain International - 1970 to 1978

England International 1970 to 1981

Yorkshire representative

Coaching career and later life
Lowe retired from playing in 1983, and began a spell coaching at York F.C., assisting them to both promotion and a place in the semi-finals of the Challenge Cup. He also undertook the role as a director of Hull Kingston Rovers. In 1995, he was the manager of England's Rugby League World Cup team. He also became a landlord, running several pubs around the Hull and East Riding area, and was also involved in property investment. As of 2011, Lowe was the landlord of the Shakespeare public house, in Baxtergate, Hedon, a role he later retired from and relinquished control to his daughter.

References

External links
Tracking down the heroes of 1972

1950 births
Living people
England national rugby league team players
English rugby league coaches
English rugby league players
Great Britain national rugby league team players
Hull Kingston Rovers players
Manly Warringah Sea Eagles players
Rugby league players from Kingston upon Hull
Rugby league second-rows
York Wasps coaches
Yorkshire rugby league team players